Morice Town is a suburb of Plymouth in the English county of Devon.

It named after Sir William Morice who owned the land at the time that it was being developed for housing for the employees in the Dockyard.

It was originally a part of the town of Devonport, but since the amalgamation of the Three Towns in 1914, it is now a part of Plymouth.

Suburbs of Plymouth, Devon